Charlotte 'Lotti' van der Gaag (18 December 1923 – 20 February 1999) was a Dutch sculptor and painter and strongly associated with members of the COBRA arts movement.

Life and career 

Charlotte van der Gaag was born on 18 December 1923 in The Hague in the Netherlands.

Aged 20, she had a relationship with the artist Bram Bogart, who introduced her to sculpture.

Around 1950, she visited the Dutch poet Simon Vinkenoog in Paris; here she was introduced to members of COBRA, amongst them Karel Appel and Corneille. During this period she concentrated almost exclusively on her sculpture.

Van der Gaag died, at the age of 75, in Nieuwegein on 20 February 1999.

References

External links

  Obituary in De Groene Amsterdammer

1923 births
1999 deaths
20th-century Dutch sculptors
Dutch women painters
Artists from The Hague
20th-century Dutch women artists